Banned From Atlantis was a Winnipeg-based punk, rock, Punk rock and indie band active from 1990 to 1995.

History
The band consisted of Mike Germain (vocals, lead guitar), James Meagher (drums), Lisa Smirl (bass) and Doug McLean (acoustic guitar). They signed with Fresh Bread Records and, in 1994, released a 15-track 'demo', titled Banned From Atlantis - Demo.  They then released the cassettes Permanent Waves and Outie, as well as a split EP with the band Elliot (not the Kentucky band of the same name).  

They then signed onto Sister Records for their 1995 release of People Write to Geena Davis in Japanese. McLean dedicated People Write to Geena Davis in Japanese to the memory of Christian J. Watson (1970–1994).

Their live shows could be described as being chaotic, sloppy and energetic. James Meagher would be behind his drum kit (usually shirtless), pounding the cymbals harder and faster than most drummers, and you could count on his crash cymbal falling over at least once during the show.  What he lacked in his ability to keep a solid rhythm, James made up in energy and ferocity.  Doug McLean would play his distorted acoustic guitar, jumping up and down in one spot while playing. 

The band broke up in late 1995.

Mike Germain joined The Hummers (another Winnipeg based band) as their keyboardist in  2001 and started his own band, Mincer Ray. Meagher joined the Air Cadets, then moved to Los Angeles to start an acting career. He returned to Winnipeg with Christina Ricci (rumoured to be his girlfriend).

Mclean went on to form the Bonaduces and The Paperbacks. Lisa Smirl won a Rhodes Scholarship and became an academic in international relations living in England. She died of cancer in 2013.

On November 10, 2010, an aging fan felt a twinge of sadness when he noticed that Winnipeg had lost one of its long-standing links to the band—the "Permanent Wave" sign at 1174 Pembina Highway, which appeared on the cover of the "Outie" cassette, had been taken down.

Discography
Banned From Atlantis, Demo (1994), Fresh Bread 
Banned From Atlantis / Elliot (1995, EP, split with Elliot), Fresh Bread
Outie (1995, EP), Fresh Bread
People Write To Geena Davis In Japanese (1995), Sister Records

References

Canadian punk rock groups
Musical groups from Winnipeg
Musical groups established in 1990
Musical groups disestablished in 1995
1990 establishments in Manitoba
1995 disestablishments in Canada